Widaczów  (Vydachiv) is a village in the administrative district of Gmina Jawornik Polski, within Przeworsk County, Subcarpathian Voivodeship, in south-eastern Poland.

The village has a population of 330.

References

Villages in Przeworsk County